Jeffrey Schlupp (born 23 December 1992) is a professional footballer who plays as a forward or winger or occasional left back for  club Crystal Palace and the Ghana national team.
Schlupp started his career as a striker.

Early life 
Schlupp was born to Ghanaian parents in Hamburg, Germany, on 23 December 1992, and raised mostly in England after his family moved there when he was young. He attended Oakgrove School in Milton Keynes along with Grimsby Town goalkeeper Max Crocombe.

Club career

Leicester City 
A product of the Leicester City youth academy, Schlupp was given a squad number, 31, for the first time for the 2010–11 season along with fellow academy players Tom Parkes and Jorrin John by then manager Paulo Sousa. Schlupp signed a new contract keeping him at the club until 2013 on 14 March 2011. Schlupp was named amongst the Leicester City substitutes for the first time by, then manager, Sven-Göran Eriksson in the 3–2 home defeat to Norwich City on 8 March 2011.

Loan to Brentford 
Schlupp joined Brentford on a one-month loan on 14 March 2011, declining a call up to the Germany Under-19 squad in order to complete the move. He made his senior debut in a 1–0 defeat to Huddersfield Town coming on as a substitute on 77 minutes on 15 March 2011. On his first full senior appearance in his career he scored two goals winning the match against Carlisle United 2–1 on 25 March 2011. Schlupp earned a start in Brentford's next match and proved himself once more by scoring a header from a Lewis Grabban cross against Sheffield Wednesday in a 3–1 victory.

On 3 April Schlupp started in the 2011 Football League Trophy Final, playing the full 90 minutes. Schlupp hit the post with an effort on goal. Carlisle United won the match 1–0.

On 14 April the loan deal was extended to the end of the 2010–11 season.

Return to Leicester City

2011–12 season 

On returning to Leicester, Schlupp travelled with the squad on their tour to Sweden often playing in friendlies as a left-back. He was given the squad number 27 for the 2011–12 season. In his first competitive senior appearance for the club he scored a hat-trick against Rotherham United in the League Cup first round on 9 August. He made his league debut in a 2–0 defeat to Reading on 13 August, and scored his first league goal in a 4–0 win over Derby County on 1 October. Schlupp scored his second league goal, and Leicester City's 4,000th home league goal, against Birmingham City in the 80th minute of 13 March 2012 Championship clash. Schlupp ended his first season in the Leicester first team, scoring six times in 26 games in all competitions.

2012–13 season 
Schlupp spent a week in January 2013 training with Manchester United. This trial was extended into a second and third week into the beginning of February. During his time at Manchester United he played two under-21 games, a game against Liverpool and then a game against West Ham at Upton Park.

Upon Schlupp's return to Leicester he found his way into the Leicester team both at left back and in attack, scoring three goals towards the latter part of the 2012–13 season. Schlupp scored key goals in back to back home games against Birmingham City and Bolton Wanderers.

2013–14 season 
Schlupp opened his goalscoring account for the 2013–14 season, rounding off a 3–1 away win to against Millwall on New Year's Day 2014 with smart finish through the goalkeeper's legs on his weaker foot. Following regular left-back Paul Konchesky receiving a three-match suspension for a red card against East Midlands rivals Nottingham Forest, Schlupp found greater opportunities at the back of the Leicester side, putting in highly rated performances against Ipswich Town and Charlton Athletic.

2014–15 season 
On 16 August 2014, Schlupp made his Premier League debut as a second-half substitute against Everton on the opening weekend of the season. On 4 October, Schlupp scored his first Premier League goal, in the 2–2 draw with Burnley. Schlupp scored his second goal of the season on 29 November, in the 2–3 defeat against Queens Park Rangers before adding his third in the 2–2 draw against Liverpool on 1 January 2015. On 18 May 2015, Schlupp's fine first season in the Premier League was met with reward as he was named Leicester City's Young Player of the Year, as voted by the fans, as well as winning the Players' Player of the Year award.

2015–16 season 

Schlupp started as the left back during Leicester's flying start to the season, although he later moved into a midfield role as the season progressed. Schlupp scored his first goal of the season in the 2–1 away victory against Norwich City. He was ruled out for six weeks in December with a hamstring injury. After returning from the injury Schlupp had a strong impact on Leicester City's season, and contributed hugely to Leicester's unlikely title triumph. As a result of his successful season Schlupp was named Leicester's Young Player of the Year for the second year running beating Demarai Gray and Ben Chilwell to the award.

Crystal Palace 

On 13 January 2017, after only four league appearances for Leicester City in 2016–17, he joined Premier League club Crystal Palace for a reported £12 million. His first appearance for the club ended in defeat by three goals to nil to London rivals West Ham United.

International career

Germany 
Schlupp was called up to a Germany under-19 training camp in early 2011, but did not earn a cap in Ralf Minge's side.

Ghana 
On 7 November 2011, Schlupp was called up to the Ghana squad to face Sierra Leone and Gabon. Schlupp made his Ghana debut against Gabon on 15 November, coming on as a late substitute for Prince Tagoe.
In April 2014, it was reported that The Black Stars' coaching team are believed to have watched Schlupp play with a view to taking him to the 2014 FIFA World Cup in Brazil following a string of impressive performances for Leicester. Schlupp played in a friendly against Netherlands on 31 May but wasn't named in Ghana's final 23. Schlupp was recalled to the Ghana squad for the 2015 Africa Cup of Nations qualifiers against Uganda and Togo in September 2014. He earned his fourth cap as a late substitute in Ghana's 3–1 win against Togo in the Black Stars' last African Cup of Nations qualifier on 19 November 2014. Schlupp returned to the Black Stars squad in March 2015, coming on as a second-half substitute in the 2–1 defeat to Senegal on 28 March and playing the full 90 minutes in a 1–1 draw with Mali on 31 March.

Schlupp scored his first goal for Ghana in a 7–1 win over Mauritius in an African Cup of Nations qualifier on 14 June 2015.

Style of play 

Schlupp is known for his extreme pace and athleticism, which allows him to be a versatile option and able to play anywhere on the left wing. Former teammate Andrej Kramarić once said of Schlupp, "I've never played with a more powerful player than Jeffrey Schlupp, such power and speed like I've never seen before."

Personal life 

Schlupp became a father in January 2014 to a son, Arlo. Outside football, Schlupp is involved in property investment, which he plans to do full time upon retiring from football.

Career statistics

Club

International

International goals
Scores and results list Ghana's goal tally first.

Honours 
Brentford
Football League Trophy runner-up: 2010–11

Leicester City
Premier League: 2015–16
Football League Championship: 2013–14

Individual
Leicester City Academy Player of the Year: 2010–11
Leicester City Young Player of the Year: 2014–15, 2015–16
Leicester City Players' Player of the Year: 2014–15

References

External links 

 Jeffrey Schlupp profile at Leicester City F.C.
 Jeffrey Schlupp profile at Crystal Palace F.C.
 

1992 births
Association football utility players
Living people
Footballers from Hamburg
Citizens of Ghana through descent
Ghanaian footballers
Ghana international footballers
German footballers
German sportspeople of Ghanaian descent
German expatriate footballers
German expatriate sportspeople in England
Ghanaian expatriate footballers
Ghanaian expatriate sportspeople in England
Association football wingers
Crystal Palace F.C. players
Leicester City F.C. players
Brentford F.C. players
Premier League players
English Football League players
Expatriate footballers in England
Footballers from Buckinghamshire
People from Milton Keynes